Amy Rose Allen is an American songwriter, record producer, and singer. She is primarily known as a songwriter for artists such as Rosé, Harry Styles, Justin Bieber, Halsey, Shawn Mendes, Selena Gomez,  Camila Cabello, and Pink Sweat$.

Allen was nominated for the first ever Grammy Award for Songwriter of the Year at the 65th Annual Grammy Awards for her work on releases by King Princess, Alexander 23, Lizzo, Harry Styles, Charli XCX and Sabrina Carpenter. On the same ceremony, she received the award for Album of the Year thanks to her contribution on Styles' Harry's House.

Early life and education 
Amy Allen grew up in Windham, Maine with her parents and two sisters. While in elementary school, Allen played bass in her sister's band Jerks of Grass, and as a teenager, she played folk and bluegrass music at bars and pubs. Allen attended Boston College and later graduated from Berklee College of Music in Boston. While at Berklee, Allen was taught by singer and producer Kara DioGuardi.

Career 
In 2015, Allen was featured in Teen Vogue, after releasing two solo EPs. Allen began her career by working on a number of solo projects and formed Amy & The Engine, a four-piece indie pop rock group, before relocating to New York for a year. The band released their first single "Last Forever" on February 14, 2015. TandeMania, their debut EP, was released on September 22, 2016.

Amy & The Engine announced their EP Get Me Outta Here! in 2017 and an East Coast tour in the summer of 2017 and a US tour in 2018. Allen described the sound of Get Me Outta Here! as being "a bit darker and heavier than the first". Amy & The Engine released the EP's lead single "Chasing Jenny" in January 2017. Allen relocated to Los Angeles in November 2017, where she began collaborating with Scott Harris and eventually signed to Artist Publishing Group. Allen subsequently began writing and producing music with other singers, including Glades and JELLO.

In 2018, Allen co-wrote Back to You with Selena Gomez, and Without Me with Halsey which reached No. 1 on Billboard's Hot 100. In 2019, Allen signed to Warner Records, and it was expected that her debut solo album would be released the following year. That same year, Allen collaborated with Harry Styles on his single Adore You, and collaborated with Halsey once more on the single Graveyard. Allen also collaborated with alternative rock band Pvris on their 2019 EP, Hallucinations. She was named as one of Variety's "2019 Hitmakers" for the single "Without Me".

In January 2020, Allen was featured in Forbes 30 Under 30 in Music. She has been announced as a panelist for the 2020 ASCAP Experience. On January 22, 2020, it was announced that Allen would be performing at the annual St. Jude Songwriters Showcase to benefit the St. Jude Children's Research Hospital, along with Gretchen Peters. On March 9, 2020, the ASCAP Experience event was cancelled due to concerns over the ongoing COVID-19 pandemic. Variety named Allen a "2020 Hitmaker" for co-writing Harry Styles’ “Adore You”.

Allen signed a recording deal with Warner Records in 2019. Over the following two years she released five singles: "Queen of Silver Linings", "Difficult", "Heaven", "What a Time to Be Alive" and "One". Her debut solo EP, AWW!, was released on November 5, 2021 with singles "A Woman's World" and "End of a Dark Age" having been released in the preceding two months.

Style and influences 
Allen has cited bands like The Cranberries and The Cure as influences on Amy & The Engine. In a 2020 interview with Variety, Allen stated that she prefers to write darker, more serious songs and that she felt the single "Adore You" was her first "feel-good song".

Discography

With Amy & The Engine

Studio albums by Amy & The Engine 

 Get Me Outta Here! (2017)
TandeMania (2016)
Summer Of '15 Sampler (2015)

Singles written by Allen

Albums featuring Allen

References

Year of birth missing (living people)
Living people
Singers from Maine
Songwriters from Maine
American women songwriters
American women singers
Record producers from Maine
People from Windham, Maine
Berklee College of Music alumni
21st-century American women
Grammy Award winners